San Martin de Tor is a comune (municipality) in South Tyrol in northern Italy, located about  northeast of the city of Bolzano.

Geography

San Martin is home to the Istitut Ladin Micurà de Rü, which is tasked with preserving and promoting the Ladin culture and language.

San Martin borders the following municipalities: Badia, Brixen, Corvara, La Val, Lüsen, Mareo, Santa Cristina Gherdëina, Sëlva and Villnöß.

Frazioni
The municipality of San Martin contains the frazioni (subdivisions, mainly villages and hamlets) of Antermëia (Antermoia/Untermoi), Lungiarü (Longiarù/Campill), and Picolin (Piccolino/Pikolein).

History

Coat-of-arms
The shield is party per cross: the first quarter represents an argent tower with azure roof on sable; the second one is an argent cross pattée on gules, above three vert mountains. The third part of vert and the fourth of sable. The tower is a reference to Tor Castle and resumes the insignia of a noble family; the cross over the mountains recalls that the town was once the Courts.

Society

Linguistic distribution
According to the 2011 census, 96.71% of the population speak Ladin, 1.82% Italian and 1.47% German as first language.

Demographic evolution

References

External links
 Homepage of the municipality 
 

Municipalities of South Tyrol